Battleborn or Battle Born may refer to:
 Nevada, the 'Battle Born State'
 Battleborn (video game), a video game by Gearbox Software
 Battleborn (short story collection), a short story collection by Claire Vaye Watkins
 Battle Born (album), an album by The Killers
 "Battle Born" (song), a song by Five Finger Death Punch
Battle Born Studios, a recording studio owned by The Killers